Sandia is an unincorporated community and census-designated place (CDP) in Jim Wells County, Texas, United States. The population was 379 at the 2010 census, down from 431 at the 2000 census.

History
Sandia was in the Casa Blanca land grant, issued to Juan José de la Garza Montemayor by Spain on April 2, 1807. The Montemayor family occupied the land until 1852. In 1896 John L. Wade purchased it and established the Casa Blanca Ranch (Wade Ranch). Upon his death the ranch was divided among his heirs, one of whom sold his share to Joseph B. Dibrell. Dibrell gave the task of dividing and selling the land to Fennell Dibrell and Max Starcke, who founded Sandia in 1907. At the time the streets were platted there was only one building in the community. Dibrell and Starcke chose the name Sandia, Spanish for "watermelon", because of the large number of watermelons grown in the area. The lots in Sandia were all sold within eight months, during which time a lumberyard, a hardware store, two grocery stores, a meat market, a boardinghouse, and a barbershop opened. By 1914 Sandia had 150 inhabitants, a bank, two general stores, and a cotton gin. The population steadily increased and in 1925 was estimated at 200. It had increased to 500 by 1927. In 1936 Sandia had three businesses, two churches, multiple farm units, and several dwellings and was a stop on the Texas and New Orleans Railroad. In 1940 it had a population of 300 and fifteen businesses. Sandia had a peak population of 310 during the 1960s and early 1970s. Residents numbered 215 in 1974 and 1990.

Geography
Sandia is located in northeastern Jim Wells County at  (28.019507, -97.878652). Texas State Highway 359 forms the northwest side of the community, leading northeast  to Mathis and southwest  to Alice, the Jim Wells county seat.

Demographics
As of the census of 2000, there were 431 people, 139 households, and 106 families residing in the CDP. The population density was 445.3 people per square mile (171.6/km2). There were 158 housing units at an average density of 163.2/sq mi (62.9/km2). The racial makeup of the CDP was 75.87% White, 1.16% African American, 3.25% Native American, 0.93% Asian, 0.23% Pacific Islander, 16.47% from other races, and 2.09% from two or more races. Hispanic or Latino of any race were 61.25% of the population.

There were 139 households, out of which 35.3% had children under the age of 18 living with them, 61.2% were married couples living together, 9.4% had a female householder with no husband present, and 23.7% were non-families. 22.3% of all households were made up of individuals, and 7.9% had someone living alone who was 65 years of age or older. The average household size was 3.10 and the average family size was 3.63.

In the CDP, the population was spread out, with 30.4% under the age of 18, 7.9% from 18 to 24, 27.6% from 25 to 44, 22.7% from 45 to 64, and 11.4% who were 65 years of age or older. The median age was 35 years. For every 100 females, there were 105.2 males. For every 100 females age 18 and over, there were 109.8 males.

The median income for a household in the CDP was $41,786, and the median income for a family was $46,579. Males had a median income of $36,319 versus $22,708 for females. The per capita income for the CDP was $11,516. None of the families and 3.4% of the population were living below the poverty line, including no under eighteens and 30.4% of those over 64.

Education
Sandia is served by the Orange Grove Independent School District.

References

Census-designated places in Jim Wells County, Texas
Census-designated places in Texas
Unincorporated communities in Jim Wells County, Texas
Unincorporated communities in Texas